Lucayablennius zingaro, the arrow blenny, is a species of chaenopsid blenny found in coral reefs around the Bahamas and the Caribbean, in the western central Atlantic ocean. It can reach a maximum length of  TL.  This species is the only known member of its genus.

References
 Böhlke, J. E. 1957 (26 July) A review of the blenny genus Chaenopsis, and the description of a related new genus from the Bahamas. Proceedings of the Academy of Natural Sciences of Philadelphia v. 109: 81-103, Pls. 5-6.
 Böhlke, J. E.   1958 (21 Feb.) Substitute names for Nystactes Böhlke and Lucaya Böhlke, preoccupied. Copeia 1958 (no. 1): 59.

External links
 

arrow blenny
Fish of the Caribbean
arrow blenny
Taxa named by Eugenia Brandt Böhlke